Nguyễn Thị Hải (born 17 April 1985) is a Vietnamese female Paralympic javelin and discus thrower.

References

External links
IPC Profile
London 2012 Profile

1985 births
Living people
Paralympic competitors for Vietnam
Athletes (track and field) at the 2012 Summer Paralympics
Athletes (track and field) at the 2020 Summer Paralympics
Vietnamese javelin throwers
Vietnamese discus throwers